Backpacking may refer to:

 Backpacking (travel), low-cost, independent, international travel
 Backpacking (hiking), trekking and camping overnight in the wilderness
 Ultralight backpacking, a style of wilderness backpacking with an emphasis on carrying as little as possible

See also

Hiking
Backpacking with animals, using pack animals to carry gear while hiking or camping
Backpacker (disambiguation)
Backpack (disambiguation)
Tramping (disambiguation), also called backpacking